The International Symphony Orchestra of Sarnia, Ontario and Port Huron, Michigan began in 1957.  The Little Orchestra Society of Sarnia and the Port Huron String Ensemble came together and formed the Orchestra.  The Orchestra is a non-profit organization and consists of around fifty-five musicians who are from both sides of the border between the United States and Canada.  Many work full-time in the music profession. Other members are engineers, teachers, doctors, nurses, and homemakers, and all are well-trained musicians. From 1997 to 2011, the Orchestra's music director was acclaimed Canadian conductor Jerome Summers.  After an extensive search lasting nearly two years, the Orchestra selected Douglas Bianchi of Wayne State University in 2012 as its new music director.  The Orchestra performs at various venues and churches in the area throughout each season, including the Imperial Oil Center for the Performing Arts in Sarnia and the McMorran Theater in Port Huron.

Affiliated organizations
In 1984, the Symphony Singers joined forces with the Orchestra, and this auditioned chorus remains with the group today.  The Symphony also sponsors a Youth Orchestra.  Two auxiliary groups also support the organization: the Symphony Association of the Port Huron Area, and the International Symphony Association. It also receives support from the Port Huron Musicale and various sponsors and supporters, both private and commercial.

Notable performers
In 2014, harmonica virtuoso Mike Stevens headlined the orchestra's "Classics Cross Country" concert.

Detroit Music Awards
In 2011, the International Symphony Orchestra was awarded the title of "Outstanding Community Orchestra" from among several American and Canadian organizations that ring Lake Huron.  The Orchestra was again nominated in 2012, but did not win.

References

Symphony orchestras
Canadian orchestras
Musical groups established in 1957
Orchestras based in Michigan